Ricardo García Ambroa (born 26 February 1988) is a Spanish former professional road cyclist.

Major results

2011
 1st Stage 2 Cinturó de l'Empordà
 5th Overall Volta ao Alentejo
 6th Overall Troféu Joaquim Agostinho
 8th Overall Vuelta a Castilla y León
 10th Circuito de Getxo
2014
 9th Overall Tour de Kumano
2015
 9th Overall Tour de Singkarak
2016
 2nd Overall Tour de Ijen
 3rd Overall Tour de Hokkaido
 3rd Overall Tour de Singkarak
1st Stage 3
 3rd Overall Tour de Flores
2017
 Tour de Molvccas
1st  Mountains classification
1st Stage 3
 5th Overall Tour de Lombok

References

External links

1988 births
Living people
Spanish male cyclists
Sportspeople from Vitoria-Gasteiz
Cyclists from the Basque Country (autonomous community)